The 40th Yasar Dogu Tournament 2012, was a wrestling event held in Ankara, Turkey between 10 and 12 February 2012.

This international tournament includes competition includes competition in both men's and women's freestyle wrestling. This ranking tournament was held in honor of the two time Olympic Champion, Yaşar Doğu.

Medal overview

Medal table

Men's freestyle

Women's freestyle

Participating nations

See also
2020 Yasar Dogu Tournament
2019 Yasar Dogu Tournament
2018 Yasar Dogu Tournament
2017 Yasar Dogu Tournament
2016 Yasar Dogu Tournament
2015 Yasar Dogu Tournament
2014 Yasar Dogu Tournament
2013 Yasar Dogu Tournament
2011 Yasar Dogu Tournament

References 

Yasar Dogu 2012
2012 in sport wrestling
Sports competitions in Ankara
Yaşar Doğu Tournament
International wrestling competitions hosted by Turkey